Monopoli is a town in Italy.

Monopoli may also refer to:
 Luigi Monopoli (born 1992), Italian footballer
 Monopoli, a 1984 song by Klaus Lage
 S.S. Monopoli 1966, a football club from Monopoli, Italy

See also 
 Diocese of Monopoli
 Roman Catholic Diocese of Conversano-Monopoli
 Monopoly (disambiguation)
 Monopol Hotel